Kevin Krawietz and Andreas Mies were the defending champions but chose not to defend their title.

Zdeněk Kolář and Lukáš Rosol won the title after defeating Evgeny Karlovskiy and Timur Khabibulin 6–3, 6–1 in the final.

Seeds

Draw

References
 Main Draw

Almaty Challenger 2 - Doubles